Brookville is an unincorporated community in Brookville Township, Ogle County, Illinois, USA.

Geography
Brookville is located on the western border of Brookville Township and Ogle County, just south of the intersection of U.S. Route 52 and Illinois Route 64, at an elevation of 781 feet.  The city of Polo is about 7 miles to the southeast.

References

Unincorporated communities in Illinois
Unincorporated communities in Ogle County, Illinois